Hippopedon is a genus of band-winged grasshoppers in the family Acrididae. There are at least three described species in Hippopedon.

Species
These three species belong to the genus Hippopedon:
 Hippopedon capito (Stål, 1873) (Apache grasshopper)
 Hippopedon gracilipes (Caudell, 1905) (Rehn's slender grasshopper)
 Hippopedon saltator Saussure, 1861

References

Further reading

 
 

Oedipodinae
Articles created by Qbugbot